Sasit is a small town 90 kilometres north of Debre Birhan in central Ethiopia. The town is known for its agricultural produce and historical sites.

History
Sasit was founded in 1938, by fascist Italians who tried to occupy Ethiopia for five years.

Historical sites
The historical sites in and around Sasit are the Andit Girar, a place where Ethiopian patriots founded their association to fight against Italian occupiers. The Engidwahsa cave is also an area of interest in Sasit. This limestone cave was a shelter for local patriots who were fighting the occupiers. There are historical churches including the well known Nechgedel Beata, Dagmawi Tsion St. Mary's church and other monasteries.

External links
Engidwasha cave

Populated places in Ethiopia